The Prisoner is a 1949 West German historical adventure film directed by Gustav Fröhlich and starring Paul Dahlke, Richard Häussler, and Käthe Dorsch. It is based a novel by the French writer Honoré de Balzac.

It was made at the Bendestorf Studios outside Hamburg. The film's sets were designed by the art director Franz Schroedter.

Cast

References

Bibliography

External links 
 

1949 films
1940s historical adventure films
German historical adventure films
West German films
1940s German-language films
Films directed by Gustav Fröhlich
Films set in France
Films based on French novels
Films based on works by Honoré de Balzac
Films set in the 19th century
German black-and-white films
1940s German films